Palmdale is an unincorporated community and census-designated place (CDP) in Derry Township, Dauphin County, Pennsylvania, United States. As of the 2010 census the population was 1,308. Palmdale is in the Harrisburg–Carlisle metropolitan statistical area.

Palmdale is in eastern Derry Township and is bordered to the north, west, and south by the community of Hershey. The eastern border of Palmdale is with the borough of Palmyra in Lebanon County.

U.S. Route 422 (E. Chocolate Avenue) is the main road through Palmdale.

References

External links 
Palmdale Profile

Census-designated places in Dauphin County, Pennsylvania
Harrisburg–Carlisle metropolitan statistical area